Henryk Serafin (born 11 July 1920 – 9 December 1997) was a football player and manager.

Football

Serafin started his footballing career in the youth teams of Wisła Kraków, first joining the club at the age of 13. He made his first team debut against ŁKS Łódź on 30 November 1938, before making a further 12 appearances the following season. In 1939, and at the age of 20, the break out of World War II stopped Serafins footballing career. After the war finished, Serafin started his career again with Legia Warsaw. Despite joining Legia in 1945, it wasn't until 1948 when he played his first game for the team, ending up playing 82 games in all competitions over the span of 4 seasons. After leaving Legia in 1951, Sarafin spent a season away from football before joining Legia's city rivals Polonia Warsaw for a season in 1952.

After his playing career, Serafin moved into management. During his time as a manager he managed 3 teams in the Tricity area. Firstly with Lechia Gdańsk for 2 seasons from 1959-60, Arka Gdynia for a season in 1961, and finally with Bałtyk Gdynia.

References 

 

1920 births
1997 deaths
Polish football managers
Polish footballers
Legia Warsaw players
Polonia Warsaw players
Wisła Kraków players
Arka Gdynia managers
Lechia Gdańsk managers
Footballers from Kraków
Association football defenders